Von Knorring is the name of an old Baltic-German noble family, whose members held significant positions within the Russian Empire and Scandinavia. They held the title of Baron in Sweden and Prussia.

Notable members 
 Bogdan von Knorring (1746–1825), Russian general
 Frans Peter von Knorring (1792–1875), Finnish social reformer
 Sophie von Knorring (1797–1848), Swedish novelist and noble
 Sophie von Knorring, (1775–1833), German writer born Sophie Tieck
 Olga Knorring (1887-1978), Russian botanist 

Other
 F.P. von Knorring (ship), ship in Mariehamn, called after the Finnish reformer.